Elizabeth Evans May  (born June 9, 1954) is a Canadian politician, environmentalist, author, activist, and lawyer who is serving as the leader of the Green Party of Canada since 2022, and previously served as the leader from 2006 to 2019. She has been the member of Parliament (MP) for Saanich—Gulf Islands since 2011. May is the longest serving female leader of a Canadian federal party.

Born in Hartford, Connecticut, Elizabeth May immigrated to Canada with her family as a teenager. She attended St. Francis Xavier University, graduated from Dalhousie University with a law degree in 1983, and later studied theology at Saint Paul University for which she told the Anglican Journal in a 2013 interview that she had to withdraw from the program due to conflicting schedule demands. Following her graduation from Dalhousie University, May worked as an environmental lawyer in Halifax before moving to Ottawa in 1985, joining the Public Interest Advocacy Centre as the associate general counsel. In 1986, she was named Senior Policy Advisor to Thomas McMillan, then-Environment Minister in the Progressive Conservative Mulroney government. As senior policy advisor, May was deeply involved in the negotiation of the Montreal Protocol, an international treaty designed to protect the ozone layer. She resigned on principle from the position in 1988 over permits for construction of a dam granted without environmental assessments, which were later determined to be illegal by a federal court. May founded and served as the executive director of the Sierra Club Canada from 1989 to 2006.

In 2006, after building the Sierra Club into a nationally effective organization, May resigned to run for leadership of the Green Party of Canada, winning on the first ballot with 66% of the vote. On May 2, 2011, May became the first member of the Green Party of Canada to be elected as a Member of Parliament, defeating Conservative cabinet minister Gary Lunn with 46% of the vote in the Saanich–Gulf Islands riding. In the 2019 federal election, she was re-elected with 54% of the vote. May resigned as Green Party leader on November 4, 2019, but remained as parliamentary leader in the house. She was a candidate in the 2022 Green Party of Canada leadership election. She ran on a joint ticket with Jonathan Pedneault. She won the election on November 19, 2022.

Elizabeth May has been an officer of the Order of Canada since 2005, and has been named by the United Nations as one of the leading women environmentalists worldwide. She was named by fellow MPs as Parliamentarian of the Year 2012, Hardest Working MP 2013, Best Orator 2014, and Most Knowledgeable 2020. In 2010, Newsweek named her as one of the world's most influential women. May has written eight books; her memoir, Who We Are - Reflections of my Life and Canada was listed as a best-seller by The Globe and Mail.

Early life and education 
May was born in Hartford, Connecticut, the daughter of Stephanie (Middleton), a sculptor, pianist, and writer, and John Middleton May, an accountant. Her father was born in New York and raised in England, and her mother was also a native New Yorker. She has a younger brother named Geoffrey. Her mother was a prominent anti-nuclear activist and her father was Assistant Vice President of Aetna Life and Casualty. The family moved to Margaree Harbour, Nova Scotia in 1972, following a summer vacation spent on Cape Breton Island. On moving to the province, the May family purchased a landlocked schooner, the Marion Elizabeth which had been used as a gift shop and restaurant since the mid 1950s. They operated this establishment from 1974 until 2002.

May briefly enrolled at St. Francis Xavier University in 1974, but dropped out. Returning to Margaree, May took correspondence courses in restaurant management. Beginning in 1980, she attended Dalhousie Law School as a mature student, graduating in 1983.

Following law school at Dalhousie University, May worked as an associate at small law firm in Halifax.

May studied theology at Saint Paul University, a federated college of the University of Ottawa.

Public life 
May first became known in the Canadian media in the mid-1970s through her leadership as a volunteer in the grassroots movement against proposed aerial insecticide spraying on forests near her home on Cape Breton Island, Nova Scotia. The effort prevented aerial insecticide spraying from ever occurring in Nova Scotia. Years later, she and a local group of residents went to court to prevent herbicide spraying. Winning a temporary injunction in 1982 held off the spray programme, but after two years, the case was eventually lost. In the course of the litigation, her family sacrificed their home and seventy acres of land in an adverse court ruling to Scott Paper. However, by the time the judge ruled the chemicals were safe, 2,4,5-T's export from the U.S. had been banned. The forests of Nova Scotia were spared from being the last areas in Canada to be sprayed with Agent Orange.

In 1980, May and others launched a political party to raise environmental and anti-nuclear issues dubbed "the Small Party". The party ran 12 candidates in six provinces in the 1980 federal election. May, at the time a 25-year-old waitress, ran against the former Deputy Prime Minister, Allan J. MacEachen in Cape Breton Highlands—Canso. She placed last in a field of four candidates receiving 272 votes.

In 1985, May moved to Ottawa to work with the Public Interest Advocacy Centre. She held the position of Associate General Counsel, representing consumer, poverty and environmental groups from 1985 to 1986.

In 1986, May became Senior Policy Advisor to then-environment minister, Thomas McMillan of the Progressive Conservatives. She was instrumental in the creation of several national parks, including South Moresby. She was involved in negotiating the Montreal Protocol to protect the ozone layer, new legislation and pollution control measures. In 1988, she resigned on principle when the Minister granted permits for the Rafferty-Alameda Dams in Saskatchewan without proper environmental assessment. The permits were later struck down by a Federal Court decision that found that the permits had been granted illegally.

May helped found the Canadian Environmental Defence Fund with the aim of funding groups and individuals in environmental cases. She has worked extensively with indigenous peoples internationally, particularly in the Amazon, as well as with Canadian First Nations. She was the first volunteer executive director of Cultural Survival Canada from 1989 to 1992 and worked for the Algonquin of Barriere Lake from 1991 to 1992. She has taught courses at Queen's University School of Policy Studies, as well as teaching for a year at Dalhousie University to develop the programme established in her name in Women's Health and Environment.

Sierra Club of Canada
In 1989, May became the founding executive director of the Sierra Club of Canada.

During her tenure with the Sierra Club of Canada, May received several awards in recognition of her environmental leadership, including: the International Conservation Award from the Friends of Nature, the United Nations Global 500 Award in 1990, the award for Outstanding Leadership in Environmental Education by the Ontario Society for Environmental Education in 1996, and in November 2005 was made an Officer of the Order of Canada in recognition of her "decades of leadership in the Canadian environmental movement".

In April 2006, May announced her resignation as the Sierra Club's executive director in order to seek the leadership of the Green Party of Canada. As one of her last major acts she participated in a poll of experts that determined that Progressive Conservative Brian Mulroney was Canada's "greenest" Prime Minister for an award presented by Corporate Knights magazine. For her prominent role in this initiative, May took some criticism from commentators and environmentalists.

Upon leaving the Sierra Club, Board President Louise Comeau noted, "Elizabeth has led the Club at the national level from its infancy to the enormously effective entity it is today, she was also instrumental in supporting development of the Sierra Youth Coalition, the Atlantic Canada Chapter and other Sierra Club chapters and local grassroots groups."

Political career

Early leadership 

On May 9, 2006, May entered the Green Party of Canada's leadership race.

On August 26, 2006, May won the leadership election on the first ballot. She tallied 65.3% of the votes, beating her main rival, David Chernushenko (33.3%) and Jim Fannon (0.88%). She said one of the main platforms for the next election would be to renegotiate the North American Free Trade Agreement (NAFTA). At the time of her election as leader, May said she intended to run in the riding of Cape Breton—Canso in the next federal election, although she also said she would stand in a federal byelection if one occurred prior to the next general election. In the fall of 2006, May ran for election in London North Centre, finishing second to Glen Pearson of the Liberal Party. While she lost, May's showing in this by-election was the best result, in terms of percentage, achieved by the Green Party of Canada at that time.

In April 2007, during a speech by May to a London, Ontario United Church of Canada, she condemned Prime Minister Stephen Harper's stance on climate change, comparing it to "a grievance worse than Neville Chamberlain's appeasement of the Nazis." The statement drew criticism from the Canadian Jewish Congress and opposition parties. While Opposition leader Stéphane Dion refused to respond to Harper's request for him to distance himself from May and these remarks during Question Period, Dion did state to reporters outside Commons that May should withdraw the remarks, and that the Nazi regime is beyond any comparison.

May said she was having "a lousy week" because of the federal government's weak action plan on the environment, but stood by her comments. In a Green Party of Canada press release, May stated that she was referencing a Chamberlain Nazi appeasement analogy made by journalist George Monbiot a few days earlier. saying "I made reference to Mr. Monbiot's statement to highlight the damage being done to Canada's international reputation, something that should concern all Canadians."

On March 17, 2007, May announced that she would run in the Nova Scotia riding of Central Nova, in the 2008 federal election. The riding was held by Conservative National Defence Minister Peter MacKay. May has explained that she chose Central Nova to avoid running against a Liberal or NDP incumbent.

On April 12, 2007, Liberal Party leader Stéphane Dion announced that the Liberals would not run a candidate in Central Nova in return for the Greens not running a candidate in Dion's safe Saint-Laurent—Cartierville riding. There was criticism from prominent Green Party members of May's failing to support all Green candidates unequivocally during the 2008 election, as she made favorable comments about Liberal leader Stéphane Dion and said that supporters in close ridings might consider voting strategically to attempt to defeat the Conservatives.

May was initially excluded from the televised national leadership debate in the 2008 federal election, based on the lack of any elected Green party MPs. She argued that the TV network consortium's initial exclusion of the Green Party of Canada was "anti-democratic" and blamed it on "the decision-making of a small group of TV network executives". Eventually May was invited to attend the televised debate.

May received 32% of the vote in Central Nova in 2008 to MacKay's 47%. Nationally the Greens received 6.8 percent of the popular vote.

Member of Parliament
In 2010, following a survey of potentially favourable electoral districts across the country, May announced her intention to run in Saanich—Gulf Islands, in British Columbia against Conservative cabinet minister Gary Lunn.

On March 29, 2011, the broadcast consortium organizing the televised national leaders' debate for the 2011 federal election announced that it would not invite May. Despite her exclusion from the national debates, she won her riding, defeating the incumbent Gary Lunn. Nationally the Greens received 4 percent of the popular vote.

In 2012, May tabled a Private member's bill, Bill C-442, with the aim of creating a national framework to address Lyme disease. On December 16, 2014, Bill C-442 received royal assent, becoming law. Bill C-442 was the first piece of Green Party legislation enacted in the history of Canada, and was passed with unanimous consent by both houses of Parliament.

The bill was introduced by May in response to the rise of lyme disease across Canada, and in recognition of the findings by groups including the Intergovernmental Panel on Climate Change, who have noted that as a result of climate change Lyme disease is beginning to spread more quickly, as the number of ticks— who serve as vectors for Lyme disease– steadily increases.

In December 2014, May presented a petition to the House of Commons by members of 9/11 Truth organizations asking the government to review the September 11 attacks in New York. While she personally did not agree with the petition, May defended presenting it and stated "It is an obligation of an MP to present every petition submitted to them." While many MPs consider it a responsibility, House of Commons rules do not require MPs to present all petitions they receive to Parliament. In 2012, the NDP Foreign Affairs Critic Paul Dewar declined to present a similar petition by another 9/11 Truth group to parliament.

Annually, Maclean's Magazine organizes an awards ceremony in which MPs recognize the achievements and hard work of their colleagues. In 2012, May was voted by her colleagues in the House of Commons as Parliamentarian of the Year, in 2013 she was voted Hardest Working MP, and in 2014 she was voted Best Orator.

May was the first MP to take a stand against Bill C-51, on February 3, 2015, Toronto Star National Affairs columnist Thomas Walkom noted that, "So far, the only opposition MP with enough guts to critique the content of the Conservative government's new anti-terror bill is Green Party Leader Elizabeth May." May and fellow Green MP Bruce Hyer tabled sixty amendments during clause-by-clause considerations of Bill C-51 – all sixty amendments were rejected by the government. May later stated of Bill C-51, "It's not fixable. Stop it. Repeal it."

On April 23, 2015, May had two amendments to Bill C-46, the Pipelines Safety Act, accepted. These were the first Green Party amendments to a government bill ever adopted. The first amendment enabled "aboriginal governing bodies to be reimbursed for actions they take in relation to a spill". Prior to the amendment, the bill outlined that those at fault in a spill would only be liable for "costs and expenses reasonably incurred by Her Majesty in right of Canada or a province or any other person". The second amendment was related to the concept of polluter pays. The original line in the bill said that the National Energy Board "may" recover funds to compensate those affected by a spill, the Green Party amendment changed the "may" to "shall".

In October 2015, Prime Minister-designate Justin Trudeau invited May to be part of the Canadian delegation to the 2015 United Nations Climate Change Conference to be held in Paris, France, in late November 2015; the summit was intended to negotiate post-2020 targets for reducing greenhouse gas emissions and resulted in the GHGPPA. According to Maclean's, "May, who requested and received a 30-minute meeting with Trudeau this week even as he was immersed in transition plans for swearing in a new Liberal government on Nov. 4, said his willingness to engage with opposition parties is also encouraging, suggesting a less hyper-partisan style of governing."

On March 23, 2018, May was arrested for civil contempt during a demonstration against the Kinder Morgan pipeline. Other members of the demonstration, including fellow Member of Parliament Kennedy Stewart, were also arrested concerning the same incident. They were accused of violating a court order requiring those demonstrating to stay five meters back from company work sites, when they allegedly blocked the roadway. On April 9, 2018, Justice Kenneth Affleck of the British Columbia Supreme Court recommended that May and the others arrested should be charged with criminal contempt in relation to the alleged incident. On April 16, 2018, it was reported that special prosecutors would be overseeing the charges against May and Stewart. On May 14, 2018, the special prosecutor handling May's case told Justice Affleck that the province was pursuing a criminal contempt of court prosecution against May. On May 28, 2018, May pleaded guilty to criminal contempt of court and was sentenced to pay a fine of $1,500. May has called for a doubling of Canada's greenhouse gas emission reduction targets to a 60% reduction from 2005 levels, instead of the current 30%.

Second leadership
After Annamie Paul, May's successor as Green Party leader, resigned following a period of internal tensions within the party and a poor performance in the 2021 Canadian federal election, May announced she would run in the leadership election to replace her. Running on a joint ticket with human rights activist Jonathan Pedneault and proposing that the party adopt a co-leadership model, May won the leadership election on November 19, 2022. As co-leadership is not formally recognized in the party’s constitution, Pedneault is serving as May's deputy leader while the two seek to amend the party constitution.

Controversies

Stance on abortion
During a visit in 2006 to the Mount St. Joseph's Convent in London, Ontario, May responded to a nun's question about her position on abortion, saying “I don’t think a woman has a frivolous right to choose. What I don’t want is a desperate woman to die in an illegal abortion.” Following initial reports of May's statements, which did not include the full quote, prominent Canadian feminist Judy Rebick announced that she was withdrawing her previous support of May and the Green Party because of May's questioning "the most important victory of the women's movement of my generation". May later clarified that she had been trying to explain to the nuns how "their belief in right to life means that they should support abortion". She explained that making abortions illegal would cause more deaths from desperate illegal abortions, as had been the case for hundreds of years previously.

In a 2011 interview with the Georgia Straight, May said her position had been "massively misreported" and explained "If a woman is in a situation where she’d like to keep her child and needs support, we also want to be there to support that choice and also to ensure that as much as possible we, in our society, provide—not just for women, but for male partners—responsibility, birth-control information in order to avoid unwanted pregnancies … So, it’s a mixed and nuanced position, but there’s absolutely no wiggle room on maintaining the right of women in this country to safe and legal abortions." She stressed that there is "no going back" on the issue, and that she is "very militant" about it.

May was interviewed by a CBC videographer that was published two days prior to the start of the 2019 federal election. May stated that the Green Party would not ban elected MPs from reopening the abortion debate. May's reasoning was that despite her own personal pro-choice views, Green Party rules do not give her the power as leader to whip votes in caucus. This position put the Greens in stark contrast to the Liberals and the NDP, both of which require attestations from MPs that they will consistently support the party's stated pro-choice platform. The Green Party released an official statement clarifying May's comments, saying that candidates are prescreened to rule out anti-abortion viewpoints, but that May's initial statement regarding the leader not having the power to whip votes remains official Green Party policy. May later backed away from the comments, saying that any Green MP who moved to re-open the debate would risk being removed from caucus.

Pseudoscience
In November 2011, May tweeted concerns about the possible dangers of WiFi. May's comments that WiFi was a "possible human carcinogen" and that the use of WiFi might be related to the "disappearance of pollinating insects" fueled attacks over the scientific soundness of her views. "It is very disturbing how quickly Wi-Fi has moved into schools as it is children who are the most vulnerable", she wrote. The National Post pointed out that May had ironically made the tweets on her cellphone.

In June 2013, during a Twitter exchange with May, a Green Party critic downloaded the party's platform and found reference to the party's support of government-subsidized homeopathy. Homeopathy found its way into the platform "by accident", May later said.

In defense of Jian Ghomeshi
In October 2014, May sent out a series of tweets defending Jian Ghomeshi, who faced allegations from three women that the radio host was physically violent to them without their consent during sexual encounters. "I think Jian is wonderful. Likely TMI for an old fogey like me, but his private life is none of our beeswax", May wrote. May then wrote, "I have known Jian and something at work here doesn't make sense. Innocent until proven guilty." When one user accused her of buying into "rape culture," she replied, "As a feminist, I do not buy into rape culture." May later stated that she regretted defending Ghomeshi, stating that she had not yet read about the allegations of physical violence in the Toronto Star and that she was still "shaken up" by the Parliament Hill shootings when she wrote the tweets.

2015 Press Gallery Dinner speech
At the Parliamentary Press Gallery's dinner in Gatineau, Quebec on May 9, 2015, May was recorded on video in front of an audience stating, "Welcome back, Omar Khadr. It matters to say it. Welcome back, Omar Khadr. You're home", in reference to Omar Khadr, a convicted child soldier. She further said, "Omar Khadr, you've got more class than the whole fucking cabinet", before being escorted off the stage by Transport Minister Lisa Raitt. Early in her speech she also questioned why no one else had mentioned the event was being held on First Nations territory, asking "What the fuck is wrong with the rest of you?"

May later blamed her actions on fatigue and insisted she hadn't had too much to drink. "I didn't have a lot of wine," May said, "but it may have hit me harder than I thought it would". When questioned if she should resign, May responded that "a lot of people have given bad press gallery speeches and have gone on to be Prime Minister or gone on to lead other aspects of their lives, time will tell." May was quick to admit that her remarks at the annual press gallery dinner in Gatineau, Quebec, were a poor attempt at comedy. However, she said they shouldn't detract from her political track record. President of the Treasury Board Tony Clement and NDP House Leader Peter Julian said Monday afternoon that May's apology was sufficient. "Look, she's apologized which was appropriate and I'm going to leave the matter at that", Clement told reporters. Laura Peck, senior partner at TransformLeaders.ca, said, "She has apologized. She's done the right thing, she's apologized", Peck said. "One mistake is forgivable, two is a pattern." It's more of an "inside Ottawa beltway" thing anyway, Peck added.

Other senior members of the media have called into question why this speech received so much attention from the press. CBC's Michael Enright noted that the Press Gallery Dinner has long been home to rowdy behaviour by both politicians and journalists, usually attracting little or no coverage. In his Sunday Edition segment, Enright even pondered, "Why the mountain of coverage, nearly all of it unsympathetic? Was it because she was appearing before a roomful of journalists? Would the story have disappeared if she had been speaking to environmentalists? Was it because she sometimes has seemed to be holier than thou? Was it because she is a woman? Whatever the reason, May was mugged by the media."

Personal life 
May has one daughter with former partner Ian Burton, Victoria Cate May Burton, who was the Green candidate in Berthier—Maskinongé in 2015, losing to NDP incumbent Ruth Ellen Brosseau.

On November 27, 2018, May announced her engagement to John Kidder, brother of actress Margot Kidder and one of the founders of the Green Party of British Columbia. Kidder had previously run as the 2011 federal Liberal candidate in Okanagan—Coquihalla and as the 2013 BC Green candidate in Fraser-Nicola. May and Kidder married on April 22, 2019, at Christ Church Cathedral in Victoria, British Columbia.

May is a practicing Anglican, and has said she is "interested, in the long term, in becoming ordained as an Anglican priest." She cites Jesus Christ as her personal hero, because "he led a revolution that was non-violent".

Honours and awards
International Conservation Award from Friends of Nature, 1985
Commemorative Medal for the 125th Anniversary of the Confederation of Canada, in recognition of significant contribution to compatriots, community and to Canada, 1992
Elizabeth May Chair in Women's Health and the Environment, Dalhousie University, 1998.
 Honorary Doctorate of Humane Letters (DHumL), Mount Saint Vincent University, 2000.
 Harkin Award from the Canadian Parks and Wilderness Society for her lifetime achievement in promoting the protection of Canada's wilderness, 2002
 Best Activist Award, Coast Magazine, Best of Halifax Readers' Poll, 2002
 Honorary Doctorate of Laws, University of New Brunswick, 2003.
 United Nations Global 500 award.
 Officer of the Order of Canada, 2005.
Couchiching Award for Excellence in Public Policy, 2006
 Honorary Doctorate of Laws, Mount Allison University, 2007.
 Newsweek Magazine: One of World's Most Influential women, November 28, 2010
 Maclean's Parliamentarian of the Year, 2012
 Awarded the Canadian Version of the Queen Elizabeth II Diamond Jubilee Medal in 2012
 Maclean's Hardest Working Parliamentarian of the Year, 2013
 Maclean's Best Orator of the Year, 2014
 Honorary Doctor of Divinity (D.D.), Atlantic School of Theology, 2015.
 Maclean's Most Knoweldgeable Parliamentarian of the Year, 2020

Electoral record

Selected works
 Budworm battles: the fight to stop the aerial insecticide spraying of the forests of eastern Canada (with Richard E.L. Rogers). 1982. Four East Publications. 
 Paradise Won: the struggle for South Moresby. 1990. McClelland & Stewart. 
 Frederick Street: life and death on Canada's Love Canal (with Maude Barlow). 2000. HarperCollins Publishers.  - focused on the Sydney Tar Ponds, and the health threats to children in the community – the issue that led her to go on a seventeen-day hunger strike in May 2001 in front of Parliament Hill.
 At the cutting edge: the crisis in Canada's forests. 2005. Key Porter Books. 
 How to Save the World in Your Spare Time. 2006. Key Porter Books. 
 Global Warming for Dummies (with Zoe Caron). 2008. Wiley & Sons Publishing. 
 Losing Confidence: Power, Politics And The Crisis In Canadian Democracy. 2009. McClelland & Stewart. 
Who We Are: Reflections on My Life and Canada (Greystone, 2014)

See also

List of Green party leaders in Canada
2008 Canadian federal election

Notes

References

External links

 

Profile at Green Party of Canada

1954 births
20th-century Canadian lawyers
20th-century Canadian non-fiction writers
20th-century Canadian women writers
21st-century Canadian politicians
21st-century Canadian non-fiction writers
21st-century Canadian women politicians
21st-century Canadian women writers
American emigrants to Canada
Canadian Anglicans
Canadian activists
Canadian environmental lawyers
Canadian women activists
Canadian women environmentalists
Dalhousie University alumni
Female Canadian political party leaders
Green Party of Canada MPs
Green Party of Canada leaders
Living people
Miss Porter's School alumni
Naturalized citizens of Canada
Officers of the Order of Canada
People from Inverness County, Nova Scotia
People from the Capital Regional District
Politicians from Hartford, Connecticut
Schulich School of Law alumni
Sierra Club executive directors
St. Francis Xavier University alumni
St. Paul University alumni
Women in British Columbia politics
Women members of the House of Commons of Canada
Writers from Hartford, Connecticut